Big Mommas: Like Father, Like Son is a 2011 American crime comedy film and the third and final installment in the Big Momma film series. It is a sequel to 2000's Big Momma's House and 2006's Big Momma's House 2.

The film was directed by John Whitesell and stars Martin Lawrence reprising his role as FBI agent Malcolm Turner. Lawrence is the only returning star from the original cast. Trent Pierce, Turner's stepson, who is a character from the previous two films, is now played by actor and stand-up comedian Brandon T. Jackson, after Jascha Washington declined to reprise his role. The film was released on February 18, 2011, by 20th Century Studios.

Plot
FBI agent Malcolm Turner is elated to learn that his stepson, Trent Pierce, has been accepted to attend Duke University in Durham, North Carolina. However, Trent is uninterested and instead wants Malcolm to sign a recording contract for him since he is underage. When Malcolm refuses, Trent's best friends encourage him to ambush Malcolm on the job in order to obtain the signature.

Malcolm, in an attempt to capture Russian gang member Chirkoff, uses an informant named Canetti to deliver a flash drive to the gang, while Trent attempts to ambush Malcolm on the job. Canetti reveals that the flash drive is empty and a duplicate is hidden with a friend at the Georgia Girls School for the Arts.

During the exchange, Canetti's cover is blown and he is killed, which Trent witnesses. Malcolm eventually rescues Trent and they escape, but since Trent's car was left at the scene Malcolm knows the gang members will be able to track them down so Malcolm and Trent are forced to hide undercover. Malcolm once again becomes Sherry's grandmother, Big Momma, and also disguises Trent as an obese girl named "Charmaine", Big Momma's great-niece. Big Momma takes a job as a house mother at the Georgia Girls School for the Arts, while Charmaine is enrolled as a student.

Surrounded by attractive young women, Trent nearly blows his cover, but manages to befriend a girl named Haley Robinson. The headmistress announces that a historic music box has been stolen from the library, and Malcolm deduces that this music box contains the flash drive. While scoping out the library, Big Momma encounters security guard Kurtis Kool, who attempts to woo her while giving a tour. Seeing a picture of Kurtis with Canetti, Malcolm realizes that he is the friend, and tries to find out more about the music box.

Meanwhile, the gang members approach Trent's best friends, posing as record producers, and encourage them to notify them of Trent's whereabouts. Charmaine sets up a date between Haley and himself, though she doubts she will be interested in the seemingly egotistical "Prodi-G", Trent's hip-hop alias. Trent reverts to his true self and the date goes well, but an encounter with Trent's best friends causes the gang members to tail them.

Trent helps Haley perfect her musical performance for the upcoming "Showcase" event, turning it into a duet, and the two exchange a kiss at the end of the date, while Haley encourages Trent to pursue college. Before the gang members can capture Trent, he changes into his Charmaine disguise, throwing them off. Learning of an exchange between two students and Kurtis Kool, Big Momma attempts to flirt with Kurtis in order to apprehend him for stealing the music box, but the secret exchange ends up being the stolen gamecock from the Ignatius Boys School.

During this encounter, Malcolm reveals his true identity to Kurtis. After gaining the favor of several students by offering sage advice and comfort to them, Big Momma finally learns the music box was actually stolen by Haley as a hazing to become a full pledged member of the "Divas", a group of top artists in the school. As she is about to perform her duet, Malcolm forces Trent to retain his Charmaine disguise, and he attempts to perform the duet with Haley as Charmaine, only to break disguise and ruin the performance. As Haley storms off, the gang members arrive and a chase ensues.

Trent accidentally draws their attention as he attempts to pursue Haley and explain himself. Just as he recovers the flash drive, the gang members catch up and hold him at gunpoint. Big Momma interferes and provides an escape, but all three are caught again and Malcolm's disguise is revealed. Just as Chirkoff is about to kill them, Kurtis arrives with a taser and saves the day.

Trent and Haley reconcile, and Malcolm signs Trent's record contract, only to have him tear it up and reveal his new plan to attend college. As the film ends, Malcolm and Trent make an agreement to keep the whole ordeal a secret from Sherry.

Cast

 Martin Lawrence as Malcolm Turner / Hattie Mae 'Big Momma' Pierce
 Brandon T. Jackson as Trent Pierce / Charmaine Daisy Pierce
 Jessica Lucas as Haley Robinson
 Tony Curran as Chirkoff
 Portia Doubleday as Jasmine
 Michelle Ang as Mia
 Emily Rios as Isabelle
 Faizon Love as Kurtis Kool (uncredited)
 Ken Jeong as Mailman
 Ana Ortiz as Gail Fletcher
 Max Casella as Anthony Canetti
 Brandon Gill as Scratch

Production 

New Regency Productions spent $32 million to make the film, less than the previous films in the series. They were able to reduce costs because Lawrence agreed to take a pay cut and thanks to tax incentives in Georgia. Principal photography began in April 2010.

Music

A music video titled "Imma Do It Big" was released on February 9, 2011. The song is by Brandon T. Jackson and features One Chance and T-Pain. The song starts off with a verse by Jackson and then a verse from T-Pain, then another verse by Jackson, but this verse is rapped by his real-life alter ego Charmaine.

Another song called "Lyrical Miracle" by Brandon T. Jackson as he goes by the name of Trent's rapper named Prodi-G and also features Martin Lawrence as his alter ego, Big Momma, with other characters from the film.

Release
In addition to the theatrical version, an unrated and extended cut of the film (marketed as "The Motherload Edition") was released on DVD. The extended version contained five minutes of new footage, consisting of a song-and-dance musical number and slightly longer edits of various scenes.

Reception

Box office 
The film was released in North America on February 18, 2011, ranking #5 that weekend, with a gross of $16,300,803 from 2,821 theaters. As of 26 May 2011, Big Mommas has grossed  $37,915,414 in the United States, and $44,770,652 elsewhere, for a worldwide total of $82,686,066.

Critical response  
 
Big Mommas: Like Father, Like Son was panned by critics. On Rotten Tomatoes the film has an approval rating of 5% based on 60 reviews with an average rating of 2.7/10. The site's critical consensus reads: "Unnecessary, unfunny, and generally unwelcome, Big Mommas: Like Father, Like Son offers more of the same for fans of Martin Lawrence's perplexingly popular series".
On Metacritic, the film has a score of 22 out of 100 based on 14 critics, indicating "generally unfavorable reviews". Audiences polled by CinemaScore gave the film an average grade of "B+" on an A+ to F scale.

Mike Hale of The New York Times notes strong similarities to Some Like It Hot and describes Faizon Love's performance as the only honestly funny thing in the whole film.

Accolades

See also
 List of black films of the 2010s

References

External links
 
 
 

20th Century Fox films
2011 films
2010s police comedy films
Cross-dressing in American films
African-American films
Dune Entertainment films
2010s English-language films
Films about dysfunctional families
Films set in California
Films set in Atlanta
Films shot in Georgia (U.S. state)
Regency Enterprises films
American sequel films
Films directed by John Whitesell
Films scored by David Newman
2011 comedy films
2010s American films